The Color of My Words is a young adult fiction book by Trinidadian author Lynn Joseph. It was published in 2000 by Harper-Collins.

The book has also been translated into Korean as   그리그리나무위에는초록바다가있다 / Gŭri gŭri namu wi enŭn chʻorok pada ka itta and Spanish as El color de mis palabras.

In 2001, it received the category of Honor Book from Jane Addams Children's Book Award for older children.

The book is set in the Dominican Republic.

References

External links
Official Harper Collins Page

American young adult novels
2000 American novels
HarperCollins books
Novels set in the Dominican Republic